Ixora ooumuensis is a species of flowering plant in the family Rubiaceae. It is endemic to the island of Nuku Hiva in French Polynesia.

References

External links
World Checklist of Rubiaceae

ooumensis
Flora of French Polynesia
Data deficient plants
Taxonomy articles created by Polbot